Game of Bones may refer to:
 Bunnock, a Russian game involving horse anklebones
 Dominoes, in which the pieces are called bones
 Dice games, in which the dice are called bones
 A Game of Bones, novel by David Donachie, part of The Privateersman Mysteries series
 "Game of Bones", an episode of the reality television cooking competition Kitchen Casino
 "Game of Bones", an episode of the children's television series Mutt & Stuff
 Game of Bones: Winter Is Cumming, a pornographic film parody by Lee Roy Myers

See also
 Bone (disambiguation)
 Knucklebones, a.k.a. jacks